His Grace Cyril Mar Baselios I is the current primate and Metropolitan of the Malabar Independent Syrian Church (Thozhiyoor Church). He is the 15th metropolitan of Thozhiyoor.

Personal life 
He was born on  30 July 1956 at Kunnamkulam.

Career 
He was ordained a deacon on December 18, 1975 at the Mar Adhai Sleeha Church by Ayyamkulam Paulose Philexenos III , the 13th Metropolitan of the Church. He was ordained on February 17, 1980 by Mathews Koorilose VIII, the 14th metropolitan of the Malabar Independent Syrian Church. He served for a long time as vicar in various parishes of the church. He has been the Vicar of St. George's Church, Chennai for a long time. He occupied the leadership positions of the Holy Church, the leadership positions of various organizations of the Church, and many official positions of the Church, including the Secretary of the Diocesan Church Reconstruction Committee. For a long time, Dayara was a priest in the palace of Thozhiyur diocese. He received the title of Ramban on March 3, 2001 and the title of Episcopa on March 10, 2001 from Panakkal Joseph Mar Koorilose IX, the 15th metropolitan. Following the resignation of Joseph Koorilose IX on May 28, 2001, Cyril Basselios was ordained as the 16th metropolitan

References

1956 births
Living people